House Building Finance Company Limited (HBFCL), previously known as House Building Finance Corporation (HBFC), is a Pakistani housing finance company which is a subsidiary of State Bank of Pakistan. Founded in 1952, it is based in Karachi, Pakistan.

Corporatization 
The company was incorporated as a corporation on 25 July 2007 and is jointly owned by the State Bank of Pakistan (90.31%) and Government of Pakistan (9.69%). On 18 February 2011 the name of House Building Finance Corporation was changed to House Building Finance Company Limited under section 39 of the Companies Ordinance 1984.

The company is now an unlisted public limited company. The company has 51 Branches, 7 Area offices, 3 Regional offices and Head Office based in Karachi.

Privatization 
The Cabinet Committee on Privatisation (CCoP) approved transaction structures for the privatization of House Building Finance Company Ltd.

Products and services

Ghar Pakistan Scheme - GPS

Housing financing for midlevel income persons.

Ghar Pakistan Plus Scheme - GPS Plus

Special scheme for construction of house with Higher income persons.

Ghar Sahulat Scheme - GSS

The scheme is used for house purchasing or construction.

HBFC Khaas

Special Scheme for Widows, Children of Martyrs of special forces, special persons, Transgenders.

Mera Pakistan Mera Ghar Scheme

Government's Markup subsidise scheme.

Ghar Ujala Scheme

Home solar system scheme from 3KW to 20KW up to 10 years.

References

State Bank of Pakistan
Financial services companies established in 1952
Housing finance companies of Pakistan
Companies based in Karachi
1952 establishments in East Pakistan